These are the lists of members of the Legislative Council of Hong Kong:

Colonial period
 List of Legislative Council of Hong Kong unofficial members 1850–1941
 List of Legislative Council of Hong Kong unofficial members 1946–1985

Introduction of indirect elections
 List of Legislative Council of Hong Kong members 1985–88
 List of Legislative Council of Hong Kong members 1988–91
 List of Legislative Council of Hong Kong members 1991–95

Fully elected legislature
 List of Legislative Council of Hong Kong members elected in 1995

SAR administration

Provisional Legislative Council
 List of Provisional Legislative Council of Hong Kong members

Since 1998
 List of Legislative Council of Hong Kong members elected in 1998
 List of Legislative Council of Hong Kong members elected in 2000
 List of Legislative Council of Hong Kong members elected in 2004
 List of Legislative Council of Hong Kong members elected in 2008
 List of Legislative Council of Hong Kong members elected in 2012
 List of Legislative Council of Hong Kong members elected in 2016
 List of Legislative Council of Hong Kong members elected in 2021

References
Members